Cleeve Heronry is a heronry in a woodland near the village of Cleeve in North Somerset. 40 nests were counted in 1994. 47 nests in 2007. CCTV from one of the nests can be viewed at Cleeve Nursery in spring while the birds are raising chicks.

An area of 3.2 hectares is owned by Avon Wildlife Trust.

References

External links
 Cleeve Heronry page at Avon Wildlife Trust website

Nature reserves in Somerset
Heronries in the United Kingdom